Westerton railway station is a railway station that serves the Westerton district in the town of Bearsden, Scotland. The station is managed and served by ScotRail as part of the Strathclyde Partnership for Transport network. It is located on the Argyle and North Clyde lines, between Drumchapel to the west, Bearsden to the north, and Anniesland and Maryhill to the south-east.

The station lies very close to the Forth and Clyde Canal and the boundary between East Dunbartonshire and the city of Glasgow.

History 

The station opened on 1 September 1913. The station has a cross platform bridge with lift access which began production in June 2017, and became operational in 2018.

Prior to 19 September 2014, Westerton was also served by the overnight Caledonian Sleeper service between Fort William and London Euston, to allow Glasgow-bound passengers to change onto a connecting service, as the sleeper used a route avoiding the city centre. From 21 September 2014 the sleeper service was re-routed to call instead at Queen Street Low Level and so the stop was removed from the timetable.

Facilities 
The station has a ticket office and ticket machine on platform 1, as well as an accessible toilet and waiting room. There is a shelter on platform 2, and benches and help points on both platforms. The car park and bike racks are adjacent to platform 1.

Passenger volume 

The statistics cover twelve month periods that start in April.

Services 

On weekdays and Saturdays, there are two trains per hour to Milngavie, two trains to Balloch and two trains to Dalmuir, the latter two calling at all stations via Singer. Heading south-east, there are two trains per hour to Airdrie, two to Springburn and two to Larkhall, via Hamilton Central. In the weekday evenings, there are an extra two trains per hour between Helensburgh Central and Edinburgh, the Springburn trains instead run to Motherwell via Whifflet, and the Dalmuir and Larkall trains do not run. On Sundays, there are two trains per hour north and west to each of Milngavie and Helensburgh, and there are two trains per hour south-east to each of Edinburgh and Motherwell (via Hamilton Central).

References

Bibliography

External Links 

Railway stations in East Dunbartonshire
Former North British Railway stations
Railway stations in Great Britain opened in 1913
SPT railway stations
Railway stations served by ScotRail
1913 establishments in Scotland